Southpoint is a commercial section of Jacksonville, Florida on the city's Southside area, eight miles from Downtown. The area is composed primarily of commercial buildings, apartment complexes and professional office centers.

Geography
Southpoint is located in the fast-growing southeast quadrant of Jacksonville, along J. Turner Butler Boulevard, an expressway which serves as a major thoroughfare to and from the Jacksonville Beaches.

Southpoint's boundaries are Bowden Road to the north, Belfort Road to the east, Butler Boulevard to the south and Interstate 95 to the west. Some businesses between I-95 and Philips Highway use Southpoint to reference their location, and there are many small hotels on that strip of land. Streets within Southpoint include Southpoint Parkway, Southpoint Drive North & South, Southpoint Boulevard, and Salisbury Road.

History
When the initial segment of J. Turner Butler Boulevard (State Road 202) was completed in 1979, access to land around Butler Blvd improved, facilitating development of the area east of Interstate 95. 
Gate Petroleum partnered with the Bryant Skinner Company in 1980 to create the  Southpoint office park and the area northeast of the intersection became Southpoint.

St. Lukes Hospital, built in 1984, is on the corner of Southpoint. It is now known as St. Vincent's Medical Center Southside. Many of the hospital's doctors have offices in Southpoint and employees live in nearby apartments.

Residents
The population is 8,078, primarily young professionals and families who rent and are political moderates.

VA Clinic Southpoint "The Southpoint facility is 30,000 square feet, according to the VA. It provides primary care, mental health treatment, physical therapy, occupational therapy, traumatic brain injury treatment and prosthetics."

See also

 Neighborhoods of Jacksonville
 Southside, Jacksonville

References

External links

Neighborhoods in Jacksonville, Florida
History of Jacksonville, Florida
Populated places in Duval County, Florida